Ghosts is a 2006 drama film directed by Nick Broomfield, based on the 2004 Morecambe Bay cockling disaster. The title is a reference to the Cantonese slang term Gweilo (鬼佬), meaning "ghost man", used for white people.

Plot
Ai Qin is an illegal Chinese immigrant to the United Kingdom. She comes from Fuzhou, China, where there the only work is badly paid agricultural labour, and even this is in short supply. Ai Qin has a son but her husband is not seen (it is later revealed that he left her for another woman). The family have some awareness of the dangers of leaving for a foreign country, and can keep in touch using mobile phones, but they have no control once Ai Qin puts herself in the hands of a "snakehead" gang who, for a deposit of $5,000 (and the obligation to pay off the loan of another $20,000), will smuggle her to Europe.

The film follows her from China to the United Kingdom where she gets a job in a meat-packing factory. It asserts that the UK's food industry is heavily dependent on underpaid, exploited migrant labour. "Massage" (i.e. sex work) is offered as a better paid alternative, but she resists this. She finds herself dependent on a "gangmaster", who, however, is only one step up himself and needs to bribe richer contractors to get her and others even badly paid work. His position and that of the group is deteriorating, and it is in some desperation that they turn to cockle-picking at Morecambe Bay.

The film begins and ends with scenes recreating the 2004 Morecambe Bay cockling disaster, in which 23 illegal workers lost their lives whilst cockle-picking.

Cast
 Ai Qin Lin as Ai Qin
 Zhan Yu as Mr. Lin
 Zhe Wei as Xiao Li
 Man Qin Wei as Chiao
 Yong Aing Zhai
 Devi Zhu
 Shaun Gallagher as Robert

Basis in fact
The 2004 Morecambe Bay cockling disaster involved 38 individuals, of whom 23 drowned. The gangmaster got 14 years' imprisonment. His girlfriend was found guilty of immigration offences. The film shows a much smaller group, so it is not a literal retelling.

Release
It was released in January 2007. It was aired on the British TV channel More4 in 2007.

References

External links
 
 
 Film review
 Review from openDemocracy.net

2006 films
2006 drama films
Drama films based on actual events
2000s Mandarin-language films
Films directed by Nick Broomfield
Films about human trafficking
Human trafficking in the United Kingdom
British drama films
Films about illegal immigration to Europe
2000s English-language films
2000s British films